Labbaik TV is a Pakistani channel, It is an Islamic channel, the first channel of Pakistan of its kind.

Labbik TV is working under AKS Communication Private Limited.

External links
 

Television networks in Pakistan
Religious television stations in Pakistan